Elliniko-Argyroupoli is a municipality in the South Athens regional unit, Attica, Greece. The seat of the municipality is the town Argyroupoli. The municipality has an area of 15.355 km2.

Municipality
The municipality Elliniko–Argyroupoli was formed at the 2011 local government reform by the merger of the following 2 former municipalities, that became municipal units:
Argyroupoli
Elliniko

References

 
Municipalities of Attica
Populated places in South Athens (regional unit)